Taysir Abu Saada (born 1951 in Gaza Strip) is a former member of the PLO and the founder of the Christian Ministry Hope for Ishmael after he converted to Christianity. He was Yasir Arafat's personal driver.

Sources

See also 
 Mosab Hassan Yousef

Further reading
Once an Arafat Man: The True Story of how a PLO Sniper Found a New Life

External links
Hope For Ishmael website

1951 births
Palestinian activists
Palestinian Protestants
Palestinian former Muslims
Palestine Liberation Organization members
Converts to Protestantism from Islam
American Protestants
Palestinian emigrants to the United States
American former Muslims
Living people